David Syrett (January 8, 1939 in White Plains, New York – October 18, 2004 in Leonia, New Jersey) was Distinguished Professor of History at Queens College, City University of New York in Flushing, New York, and a widely respected researcher and documentary editor on eighteenth-century British naval history and the Battle of the Atlantic during World War Two.

Early life and education
The son of the well-known historian of the early American republic and editor of the Papers of Alexander Hamilton, Harold Syrett (d. 1984), David Syrett was graduated from Columbia University in 1961. After completing his M.A. at Columbia in 1964, he went on the University of London, where he completed his Ph.D. in 1966 with a thesis on “Shipping and the American War.

Academic affiliations
New York Military Affairs Symposium, President, 1990–2004

Published works
 Shipping and the American war, 1775-83 : a study of British transport organization (1970)
 The siege and capture of Havana, 1762 (1970)
 The Lost war: letters from British officers during the American Revolution edited and annotated by Marion Balderston and David Syrett; introduction by Henry Steele Commager (1975)
 The Royal Navy in American waters 1775-1783 (1989)
 The commissioned sea officers of the Royal Navy, 1660-1815, edited by David Syrett and R.L. DiNardo (1994)
 The defeat of the German U-boats: the battle of the Atlantic (1994)
 The battle of the Atlantic and signals intelligence : U-boat situations and trends, 1941-1945 (1998)
 The Royal Navy in European waters during the American Revolutionary War (1998)
 "The Raising of American Troops for Service in the West Indies during the War of Austrian Succession, 1740-1", Historical Research Vol. 73, No. 180 (February 2000), pp. 20–32.
 The Battle of the Atlantic and signals intelligence : U-boat tracking papers, 1941-1947 (2002)
 The Rodney papers: selections from the correspondence of Admiral Lord Rodney (2005, 2007)
 Admiral Lord Howe: A Biography (2006)
 Shipping and Military Power in the Seven Years' War: The Sails of Victory (2007)

Sources and references
 Obituary, The Independent (London), 19 January 2005, p. 35
 Obituary, New York Times, 23 October 2004, p. A18

1939 births
2004 deaths
American naval historians
American male non-fiction writers
Columbia College (New York) alumni
Alumni of the University of London
Fellows of the Royal Historical Society
People from White Plains, New York
Historians from New York (state)
20th-century American male writers